Rejinagar Assembly constituency is an assembly constituency in Murshidabad district in the Indian state of West Bengal.

Overview
As per orders of the Delimitation Commission, No. 70 Rejinagar Assembly constituency  covers Beldanga II community development block, and Begunbari, Kapasdanga and Mirjapur I gram panchayats of Beldanga I community development block.

Rejinagar Assembly constituency is part of No. 10 Baharampur (Lok Sabha constituency).

Members of Legislative Assembly

Election results

2013 bye election
The 2013 by-election was necessitated by the switch-over of sitting Congress MLA Humayun Kabir to Trinamool Congress.

2011
In the 2011 election, Humayun Kabir of Congress defeated his nearest rival Serajul Islam Mondal of RSP.

References

Assembly constituencies of West Bengal
Politics of Murshidabad district